Sam Gross (born August 7, 1933) is an American cartoonist, specializing in single-panel cartoons.

History
Born in Bronx, New York City, Gross was the son of Max and Sophie, who were Jewish immigrants to America. His mother was born in Iași, Romania and his father was born in Lithuania. His parents came to the United States as children around 1905. Gross' ability to draw came from his mother's artistic side of the family. His father was a CPA, which is why Gross is so well-organized.

Gross attended DeWitt Clinton High School, which at the time was an all-boys school. After he graduated, Gross went to City College. He started as a business major, then he wanted to be an accounting major, and finally an advertising major. Gross ended up taking a lot of art and history courses.

Sam Gross began cartooning in 1962 and has continued ever since. His cartoons have appeared in numerous magazines, including Cosmopolitan, Esquire, Good Housekeeping, Harvard Business Review and The New Yorker.

He was cartoon editor for National Lampoon and Parents Magazine. Gross also became involved in electronic publishing ventures with cartoons playing an important role.

Work habits
Every Wednesday Gross sits down to draw and, what he calls, "trip". He claims that he does not draw for magazines or newspapers, he just draws. Gross averages 16–17 drawings a week, and numbers and dates every one. Once finished, he photocopies the drawings on forty-four-pound stock paper, then punches three holes and puts them into loose-leaf books; Gross is afraid of losing his original copy and idea. In 2012, Sam Gross had a total of about 27,592 cartoons.

Comic strips
Gross created the comic strip Cigarman.

Collections
Published collections of cartoons by Sam Gross include:
How Gross! : The Collected Craziness of S. Gross (1973)
I Am Blind and My Dog Is Dead (1978)
An Elephant Is Soft and Mushy (1982)
More Gross (1982)
Totally Gross (1984)
Love Me, Love My Teddy Bear (1986)
No More Mr. Nice Guy (1987)
Your Mother Is a Remarkable Woman (1992)
Catss by Gross (1995)
We Have Ways of Making You Laugh: 120 Funny Swastika Cartoons (2008)

References

External links
The Comics Journal: Sam Gross interview
CartoonBank: Sam Gross

1933 births
American cartoonists
Living people
The New Yorker cartoonists
American people of Romanian-Jewish descent
American people of Lithuanian-Jewish descent
Inkpot Award winners
Jewish American artists
National Lampoon people
DeWitt Clinton High School alumni
City College of New York alumni
21st-century American Jews